Lauren Mansfield (born 18 December 1989) is an Australian professional basketball player for the Perth Lynx of the Women's National Basketball League (WNBL).

Career

College
Lauren played college basketball for two years at Midland College in Texas before strong showings earned her a transfer to Iowa State University to play for the Iowa State Cyclones in the Big 12 Conference where she was  starting point guard.

Australia
After returning from college, Mansfield signed on with her home team the Adelaide Lightning. She has also played in the South East Australian Basketball League for the Launceston Tornadoes since the 2013 season. After not playing the 2014–2015 season, Mansfield signed on for the South East Queensland Stars inaugural season making her return to the WNBL. Mansfield played a larger role than originally anticipated due to the untimely injury of Erin Phillips.  She made the most of opportunity, finishing in the league's top 10 scorers with 15.5 points per game, and 2nd in the league for assists with 5.4 per game.  Her excellent season was recognised by finishing in 8th place for WNBL MVP voting, and being named in the Australian Opals squad for the 2016 Summer Olympics. In May 2016 she was signed by the Canberra Capitals.

On 13 March 2018, Mansfield signed a two-year deal with the Perth Lynx.

References

1989 births
Living people
Guards (basketball)
Australian women's basketball players
Iowa State Cyclones women's basketball players
Junior college women's basketball players in the United States
Universiade medalists in basketball
Basketball players from Adelaide
Universiade bronze medalists for Australia
Medalists at the 2009 Summer Universiade
Medalists at the 2013 Summer Universiade
20th-century Australian women
21st-century Australian women